The Welcome Burglar is a 1909 American silent short drama film directed by D. W. Griffith.

Cast
 Marion Leonard as Alice Pierce
 Harry Solter as Ben Harris
 Charles Inslee as Employer / Husband
 Linda Arvidson as The Maid
 Edwin August
 Edward Dillon
 George Gebhardt as In Office / Burglar
 Robert Harron as Messenger
 Anita Hendrie as In Office
 Arthur V. Johnson as In Office / In Bar
 David Miles as In Office / Bartender
 Owen Moore as In Office / In Bar
 Mack Sennett as The Butler

References

External links
 

1909 films
1909 drama films
Silent American drama films
American silent short films
American black-and-white films
Films directed by D. W. Griffith
1909 short films
1900s American films